Mayhem & Miracles is the third studio album by New Zealand recording artist Savage.

Background and recording
Mayhem & Miracles was recorded and mixed at The Vault in Hollywood, California and is heavily influenced by Polynesian music. The cover art was designed by Elliot Francis Stewart.

Release and promotion
Mayhem & Miracles was released worldwide as a digital download and compact disc by Dawn Raid Music on 29 June 2012. "Twerk" was released as a single on 4 May 2012. Savage embarked on the Mayhem & Miracles Twerk Tour around New Zealand in October 2012.

Reception
Alistar Wickens of NZ Musician wrote that the album is more mature and deep than Savage's previous work, and less hook-rich.
Mayhem & Miracles appeared at number twenty-five on the New Zealand Albums Chart dated 9 July 2012, and fell off the chart the next week. It was nominated for Best Urban/Hip Hop Album at the 2012 New Zealand Music Awards, but lost to Home Brew's self-titled debut album.

Track listing
"My Time" (featuring Shaxe and L-Dubb) - 3:52
"All In" (featuring Baby Downn) - 3:41
"Twerk" - 3:21
"Because of You" (featuring SpawnBreezie) - 3:41
"Get Paid" (featuring Monsta G and Jah Free) - 3:46
"Block Exchange" (featuring Monsta G, Ganxsta Ridd and Shaxe) - 3:25
"I'm a Polynesian" (featuring L-Dubb, Shaxe and Mareko) - 4:19
"Come Out (Wrath of a Menace)" (featuring Monsta G and Jah Free) - 3:59
"Everywhere I Go" - 3:39
"This Is Me" (featuring Devolo) - 3:38
"I Promise" (featuring Ria) - 3:15

References

2012 albums
Savage (rapper) albums